The Queen Sofía Bridge (Spanish: Puente Reina Sofía), better known as the Iron Bridge (Puente de Hierro), is a bridge in Talavera de la Reina, Spain. It crosses over the Tagus.

History and description 

Following an earlier tentative project in 1879, the definitive project for the bridge was approved in 1897. The bulk of the building works took place between 1905 and 1908. Crossing over the Tagus, it displays a total length of 426 m, with 10 stretches with a homogeneous span of about 41 m.

It was opened on 25 October 1908. Following its inauguration it became a symbol of modernity in the city, that previously only had the Old Bridge as way to cross the river.

Originally coloured in bluish-gray, the bridge was painted in red in 1994.

References 
Citations

Bibliography
 

Bridges over the Tagus
Bridges in Talavera de la Reina
Tied arch bridges
Road bridges in Spain
Bridges completed in 1908